Wrangel is a Germanic surname.

Wrangel or Wrangell may also refer to:

Places
 Wrangel Island, a Russian island in the Arctic Ocean
 Wrangell Island, Alaska
 Wrangell, Alaska
 Wrangell Airport
 Fort Wrangel
 Wrangell Mountains, Alaska
 Mount Wrangell

Ships
 , ships built during World War I
 , several ships of the Swedish Navy
 , an American ship launched in 1944

Other
 Wrangel family, a Baltic German noble family

See also
 
Wrangle (disambiguation)
Wrangler (disambiguation)
Rangel (disambiguation)
Rangle, stones fed to hawks to aid in digestion